Neopicrorhiza is a genus of flowering plants belonging to the family Plantaginaceae.

Its native range is Himalayas to South-Central China.

Species
Species:

Neopicrorhiza minima 
Neopicrorhiza scrophulariiflora

References

Plantaginaceae
Plantaginaceae genera